Sir (Lawrence) Emmet McDermott KBE (6 September 1911 – 31 August 2002) was an Australian dentist, politician and Lord Mayor of Sydney between 1969 and 1972.

Early life
Emmet McDermott was born in Glebe, the sixth of ten children. Educated at St Ignatius' College and the University of Sydney where he graduated in dentistry, he earned a doctorate of dentistry from Northwestern University in Chicago. McDermott was Consultant Dental Surgeon at the Royal Prince Alfred Hospital from 1942 and also worked at the Sydney Dental Hospital. He was the President of the Australian Dental Association (NSW) from 1960 to 1961 and became a Fellow of the Royal Australasian College of Dental Surgeons (FRACDS).

City of Sydney
Joining the Civic Reform Association, he was elected to the Council of the City of Sydney in 1962, becoming Lord Mayor in 1969.

As Lord Mayor, he was instrumental in the preservation of the historic Queen Victoria Building and the conversion of Martin Place into a pedestrian mall.

Later life
In the 1972 New Year Honours he was made a Knight Commander of the Order of the British Empire (KBE) in the civil division.

Sir Emmet McDermott died in 2002 age 90. He is survived by his son and daughter from his first marriage, and his second wife.

References

Australian dentists
Australian Knights Commander of the Order of the British Empire
Australian politicians awarded knighthoods
Mayors and Lord Mayors of Sydney
Northwestern University Dental School alumni
University of Sydney alumni
1911 births
2002 deaths
20th-century Australian politicians
Councillors of Sydney County Council
20th-century dentists